Gariend Kallan is a village in Budgam district situated in  Jammu and Kashmir, India. It is bordered by Wahabpora, Garandkhurd,  Chattabug, Soibug and Wadwan.

Gariend Kallan falls under the administrative division of tehsil Budgam. Budgam is both the district & sub-district headquarter of the village. The total geographical area of village is 360 hectares. The literacy rate of the village is about 65%. There are Seven mohallas in Gariend Kallan. There are two government middle schools schools as well as one primary school.
There are many Shia Muslims in the district of Budgam. Imam Jaffar Sadiq(a.s) library is present in the village. Many Majlis and festivals are celebrated here such as Nauroz, Ashoora, Sham-i-Ghareban, Eid-ul-Fitr, Eid-ul-Azha, Eid-i-Ghadeer, Shab-e-Meraj.. 
. 
There is a Jamia Masjid in the village named after the first Iranian Supreme Leader Ruhollah Musavi Khomeini(r.a). Villagers here follow Iranian traditions. 
 Ichgam
 Wahabpora
 Dadina

References

Budgam district